The Ford Cup is a defunct WTA Tour-affiliated tennis tournament played in 1985. It was held at the Frenchman's Creek Beach & Country Club in Palm Beach Gardens, Florida in the United States and played on outdoor clay courts.

Results

Singles

References
 WTA Results Archive

Tennis in Florida
Clay court tennis tournaments
Tennis tournaments in the United States
WTA Tour